Victor Regnart (1886–1964) was a Belgian painter.

1886 births
1964 deaths
20th-century Belgian painters